Aaron is the brother of Moses in Jewish, Christian and Islamic texts.

Aaron or Aaron's may also refer to:

Names 
 Aaron (given name), name origin, variants, people, and fictional characters with the given name
 Aaron (surname), name origin, variants, and people with the surname

Places

United States
 Aaron, Georgia, an unincorporated community
 Aaron, Indiana, an unincorporated community
 Aaron, Kentucky, an unincorporated community
 Aaron, Oklahoma, a ghost town
 Lake Aaron, a lake in Minnesota

Elsewhere
 Aaron, Malawi, a village on the shore of Lake Malawi

Other uses 
 Aaron (Book of Mormon city), a city located near Nephihah, according to the Book of Mormon
 Aaron (Nephite), a person in the Book of Mormon
 Aaron's, Inc., American lease-to-own retailer
 AARON, an artificial intelligence program
 AaRON (Artificial Animals Riding On Neverland), a French singing pop duet
 Teofilo Vargas Sein, religious leader nicknamed "Aaron" or "brother Aaron" by followers of the Mita religious congregations

See also 
 
 Aaron's beard, common name of several plants
 Aaron's rod (disambiguation)
 Aron (disambiguation)
 Erin (disambiguation)
 Y-chromosomal Aaron, the hypothesized most recent common male ancestor of many kohanim